Gary William Rees (Born Long Eaton) is a former English rugby union player. He played as a flanker.

Rees played his entire career at Nottingham R.F.C., from 1977/78 to 1993/94. He then started an assistant coach career at the same team.

He had 23 caps for England, from 1984 to 1991, scoring 2 tries, 8 points in aggregate. He played in four Five Nations Championship competitions, in 1986, 1987, 1988 and 1989. He was called for the 1987 Rugby World Cup, playing in four games, and the 
1991 Rugby World Cup, playing in a single game, that would be the last from his international career, aged 31 years old.

References

External links
Gary Rees at Sporting Heroes Website

1960 births
Living people
English rugby union players
English rugby union coaches
England international rugby union players
Rugby union flankers
Rugby union players from Derbyshire